Amphiareus obscuriceps is a species from the genus Amphiareus. The species was originally described by Bertil Poppius in 1909.

References

 
Anthocoridae